Clos Marey-Monge is a vineyard in the village of Pommard, in Burgundy, France. It is the official vineyard of Château de Pommard.  

The vineyard is named with Clos (English: 'enclosure') due to the fact that it is walled up.  The word "clos" references the wines that come from this vineyard. 

The terroir of the 20ha large Clos Marey-Monge includes:

 Simone
 Chantrerie
 Les Paules
 Grand Champs
 75 Rangs
 Micault
 Émilie

UNESCO World Heritage 
In July 2015, UNESCO declared the area where the vineyard is located a world heritage protected Climate of Burgundy.

References 

Vineyards
Burgundy (historical region) wine producers
World Heritage Sites in France